, or AKB48 sister groups, shortened to 48 Group, 48g, refers to the sister groups of the Japanese idol girl group AKB48. Based on the same concept "idols you can meet", it currently consists of 5 sister groups in locations across Japan and 7 sister groups in major Asian cities overseas from Indonesia to India. The Japan-based sister groups not only release their own singles, but also perform on some of the AKB48 singles and events. They also send participants in the AKB48 annual events such as the AKB48 general election. The sister groups outside Japan release local-language versions of the AKB48 singles. In their early development, they are often supported by temporary, concurrent members of AKB48, such as Jurina Matsui and Miyuki Watanabe.

History 
AKB48's first sister group, SKE48, was formed in 2008 with its theater in Sakae, Nagoya. SDN48 ("Saturday Night"), NMB48 ("Namba") and HKT48 ("Hakata") were later formed. NGT48 was launched in 2015, and is located in Niigata. STU48, the latest Japanese sister group, was announced during the AKB48 rock-paper-scissors tournament on October 10, 2016. It is based on the seven prefectures adjoining the coast of the Seto Inland Sea and they performed on a ship for a while.
Following the assault on NGT48 member Maho Yamaguchi, the management of AKB48 faced severe public criticism. In response, it was announced to significantly change AKB48 management structures, with individual companies independently running each of the Japanese groups.

In 2011 AKB48's first sister group outside Japan, JKT48, was announced; the group is based in Jakarta, Indonesia. JKT48 was followed by SNH48 based in Shanghai, China. On June 6, 2016, AKB48 announced it had suspended its partnership with SNH48 due to the latter's contract violations. Following the statement, SNH48 declared that it had been completely independent from AKB48 from the beginning and SNH48 management had never made any form of partnership with AKS.

On October 12, 2016, AKS announced the "AKB48 China" project; two members were selected and participated in Produce 101 China. The first group of the project, AKB48 Team SH, was launched in early 2018 and audition began in April 2018.

The creation of the TPE48 was announced on October 10, 2011, in AKB48's official blog. At that time, AKS cooperated with Yoshimoto Kogyo Taipei Branch and expected to start audition in 2012. However, the two sides failed to reach a consensus in the preparation work, and thus they were discontinued after the second half of 2012. Three new overseas sister groups were announced in March 2016: BNK48, based in Bangkok, Thailand; MNL48, based in Manila, the Philippines and TPE48, based in Taipei, Taiwan. On July 30, 2018, AKS canceled a joint venture and license agreement with TPE48's management and created AKB48 Team TP. The formation of CGM48, named after and based in Chiang Mai, Thailand, as a domestic sister group of BNK48 was announced in Chiang Mai on 2 June 2019.

On December 27, 2017, Yui Yokoyama, the general manager of AKB48, announced the formation of MUM48, based in Mumbai, India, through a Showroom live broadcast. AKS cooperated with Rashmi Raj Media Pvt. ltd, and audition began in early 2018. However, the group's official site was closed in July 2018. On June 19, 2019, DEL48 and MUB48, based on India's New Delhi and Mumbai respectively, were announced. The group went on an indefinite suspension in November 2020 and later disbanded in July 2022 due to the COVID-19 pandemic.

On June 21, 2018, AKS announced the formation of SGO48, based in Ho Chi Minh City (Saigon), Vietnam. On December 5, 2021, it was announced SGO48 will disband after their 3rd anniversary on December 22, 2021 due to the COVID-19 pandemic.

AKB48 Group also has their "official" rival group, the Sakamichi Series, also produced by Akimoto Yasushi. The Sakamichi Series consists of groups Nogizaka46, Sakurazaka46, Hinatazaka46, and Yoshimotozaka46.

SNH48 Group is also known to be a big rival against AKB48 Group:  After creating their own sister groups BEJ48, GNZ48, SHY48, CKG48 and IDOLS Ft, and JNR48 the group got more recognition in China. Their single "Forest Theorem" was bought 200,000 times in just a few minutes.

Produce 48 and Iz*One

Produce 48 
On June 15, 2018, AKB48 groups participated in the Korean reality competition show Produce 48, which acted as the third season for the Mnet series Produce 101. The show brought in 96 girls to compete for a spot in a 12-member girl group that would promote in both Korea and Japan for two and a half years. Of those 96 contestants, 57 were from Korean talent agencies while 39 were from the AKB48 group. On August 31, 2018, the show's final episode aired and the final contestants were chosen to debut in a new group named Iz*One. Among the 12 members chosen to debut were AKB48's Hitomi Honda, HKT48's Nako Yabuki and Sakura Miyawaki.

Iz*One 
Iz*One was an immediate success, their debut showcase at the Olympic Hall sold out within minutes. On October 29, 2018, Their first extended play COLOR*IZ  was released, it sold over 34,000 units as reported by Hanteo Chart, setting a new record for the highest number of albums sold on the first day of a Korean girl group's debut release. The music video for the lead single "La Vie en Rose" achieved more than 4.5 million views within 24 hours of its release on YouTube, making it the most-watched debut music video by a Korean act in 24 hours. Since their debut, the group has earned multiple awards, including best rookie group of the year at the Mnet Asian Music Awards.

On November 11, The group was scheduled to release their first studio album. However, the release was postponed due to the Mnet vote manipulation investigation. Investigations revealed that the Produce 48 producer Ahn Joon-young had selected the twelve members of Iz*One from the top 20 just before the airing of the finale. As a result, Iz*One's showcases, promotions, and several guest appearances were cancelled or put on hold, which included the release of their concert film, Eyes on Me: The Movie, and their Japanese promotions. On January 6, 2020, the members' agencies and CJ ENM reached an agreement to resume the group's activities.

Current groups

Former groups

AKB48 Group timeline 
AKB48 Group timeline

Distribution map

See also 
 Sakamichi Series, (Nogizaka46, Sakurazaka46, and Hinatazaka46) official AKB48's rival group by the same producer
 SNH48 Group, groups under the SNH48 brand in China
 Iz*One, a South Korean girl group formed from the television competition show Produce 48, of which its Japanese contestants were from the AKB48 groups
 List of songs recorded by AKB48
 22/7, a voice actress idol group produced by the same producer
 Onyanko Club and Musukko Club, two groups who were popular back in the 80s and 90s produced by the same producer.

Notes

References 

 
Musical collectives